South Beaches is an unofficial area in Brevard County, Florida, United States. It includes cities, towns and unincorporated area on the barrier island south of Patrick Space Force Base. The cities and towns include: South Patrick Shores, Satellite Beach, Indian Harbour Beach, Indialantic and Melbourne Beach, and the city of Melbourne.

The government has historically labeled the actual beach areas differently. These names appear to be at variance with those in popular use.

History
In 1605, Alvaro Mexia reported that the winter site of the former Ais Indian town of Pentoaya was right across the lagoon on the barrier island from what is now Ballard Park. However, Vero Beach makes the same claim.

Beach replenishment is required to encourage tourism. Replenishment is planned every six years.

In 2002, $15.5 million was spent to widen the beach in Indialantic and Melbourne Beach.

There was a beach restoration project in 2005 in Indialantic to just north of Spessard Holland North Beach park, Melbourne Beach. This largely eroded a year ahead of expectation in 2009. The federal government is contributing $7 million, the state $2.6 million, and the county $2.8 million. The project is expected to move  of sand.

The  area south of Patrick Space Force Base to Indialantic, was skipped for fear of harming the threatened reef developing worm, sabellariids. $30 million is planned to replenish this beach from 2010 through 2013.

In 2011, alcoholic beverages were allowed on the beaches themselves in most municipalities, except Satellite Beach and Indialantic. Some parks are restricted in Indian Harbour Beach.

This stretch of barrier island is also home to Ponce de Leon Park, the site where many believe he first touched land on the North American continent.

Media
 Florida Today started to publish a free weekly paper, The Breeze in about 2009 which contained all communities.
 The Hometown News - a free weekly paper that is distributed to each home

Notes

Beaches of Brevard County, Florida
Beaches of Florida